Flavivirga aquatica is a Gram-negative, aerobic and slightly alkaliphilic bacterium from the genus of Flavivirga.

References 

Flavobacteria
Bacteria described in 2017